"Hide and Seek" is the fourth studio single by British synthpop band Mirrors. The single was released in the UK on 15 November 2010 as a 7" single, 12" single and as a digital download.

The song was included on Mirrors' first EP Broken by Silence which was released in the same month and later included on their debut album Lights and Offerings in February 2011.

The 12" single is marked as a promotional item and comes in a black die cut sleeve. The digital remix bundle comes with a red tinted sleeve variant.

Track listing

Personnel
 James New
 Ally Young
 James Arguile
 Josef Page

References

External links
 Official Website
 Skint Records
 Official German Portal

2010 singles
2010 songs